Eda Adriana Rivas Franchini (born March 23, 1952) is a Peruvian lawyer and politician. She served as Minister of Justice and Human Rights from 2012 to 2013, and Minister of Foreign Relations from 2012 to 2013, under president Ollanta Humala.

Early life and education
Eda Rivas was born in Lima on March 23, 1952. She graduated in law from the Pontifical Catholic University of Peru. Additionally, she completed a postgraduate specialization in Public Services Management from the University of Castilla-La Mancha in Spain, and also obtained a postgraduate specialization in Infrastructure Regulation from the Public Service at the University of Las Palmas de Gran Canaria.

Rivas was married to the jurist Diego García-Sayán Larrabure, former president and current judge of the Inter-American Court of Human Rights, with whom she has three children: Enrique Diego (b. 1979), Gonzalo Alonso (b. 1981) and Rodrigo Aurelio (b. 1983).

Career
Rivas started her career as legal advisor in various public entities, such as ENAPU, OSITRAN, and COPRI, as well as advisor to the office of the Prime Minister of Peru, and the Ministry of Foreign Relations (2000-2001).

In the private sector, she has been a consultant in various areas, in particular related to business competitiveness, good corporate governance, corporate social responsibility and others. In the field of university teaching, she has been a professor of administrative law at the Pontificia Universidad Católica del Perú. From March 2004 to October 2009, she was advisor to the general management and the presidency of the Peruvian Institute of Business Action (IPAE).

Presidency of Ollanta Humala
In the Ollanta Humala's administration, Rivas was appointed Chief of the Cabinet of Advisers to the Ministry of Justice. She was subsequently appointed Deputy Minister of Justice in December 2011.

On July 23, 2012, she was sworn as Minister of Justice and Human Rights, forming part of the third cabinet of president Ollanta Humala, led by Juan Jiménez Mayor.

Less than year after her appointment as Justice Minister, Rivas was rotated in the cabinet as Minister of Foreign Relations, becoming the first woman to be appointed Foreign Minister in Peruvian history.

On October 2, 2013, Rivas accompanied President Humala on an official tour to Asia. The Peruvian delegation was in Bangkok, Thailand, where the negotiations for a Foreign Trade Agreement were concluded. Subsequently, they headed to Bali, Indonesia, to attend the APEC summit, in which Humala participated alongside other heads of state. Unexpectedly, on October 7 it was announced that the Peruvian president would anticipate his return and that he would take advantage of a stopover in Paris to meet with French President François Hollande, a meeting agreed upon at the latter's request. Immediately, several Peruvian parliamentarians warned that the Congress of the Republic had given permission only for an international tour of Asia, but not France, for which a “constitutional violation” would have been committed.

On October 11, 2013, Rivas appeared before Congress to explain this situation; she justified the arrival of President Humala in Paris, arguing that it was only a "technical stopover", but not a trip; she also maintained that the meeting with the French president was “informal,” thus justifying the fact that Congress had not been asked for permission, without taking into account that State issues were discussed at the bilateral meeting. On October 14, 2013, a group of parliamentarians raised a censure motion against the Minister of Foreign Affairs. On October 20, after four hours of intense deliberation, the Congress went to the vote, which was favorable: 54 votes against censorship, 52 in favor and 4 abstentions

An important event that occurred during her term at the Foreign Ministry was the International Court of Justice verdict on the controversy of maritime delimitation between Chile and Peru, on January 27, 2014, by which Peru recovered 50 thousand km² of sea.

On June 23, 2014, she was replaced by Gonzalo Gutiérrez Reinel, a career diplomat. This decision took her by surprise, since she expected her change for July of that year.

On April 16, 2015, she was appointed Peruvian Ambassador to Italy, a position she assumed in May of the same year. In addition, she was designated as the Permanent Representative of Peru to the Food and Agriculture Organization of the United Nations (FAO); before the World Food Program (WFP); and before the International Fund for Agricultural Development (IFAD). She was additionally named ambassador to San Marino and Cyprus. She was replaced in all diplomatic posts at the start of the presidency of Pedro Pablo Kuczynski.

References

External links 

photo

Living people
1952 births
Peruvian Ministers of Justice
Foreign ministers of Peru
Ambassadors of Peru to Italy
Ambassadors of Peru to San Marino
Peruvian women lawyers
Female justice ministers
Female foreign ministers
Government ministers of Peru
Women government ministers of Peru
Pontifical Catholic University of Peru alumni
University of Castilla–La Mancha alumni
University of Las Palmas de Gran Canaria alumni
Academic staff of the Pontifical Catholic University of Peru
20th-century Peruvian lawyers
21st-century Peruvian lawyers